Graphoceratidae is an extinct family of ammonites in the order Ammonitida, which lived during the Jurassic.

Distribution
Fossils are found in the Jurassic marine strata of Canada, France, Germany, Hungary, Italy, Morocco, Saudi Arabia, Spain and the United Kingdom.

Genera
Subfamily Graphoceratinae Buckman, 1905
 Brasilia 
 Graphoceras 
 Hyperlioceras
 Ludwigia 
Subfamily Leioceratinae  Spath, 1936
 Canavarella 
 Costileioceras 
 Vaceckia  
 Leioceras 
 Staufenia
 Ancolioceras
Subfamily Dumortieriinae   Haug, 1885
 Dumortieria
 Pleydellia
 Catulloceras
 Cotteswoldia
 Walkericeras
 Canavarina
 Paradumortieria
Subfamily Tmetoceratinae   Spath, 1936
 Tmetoceras

References
 Paleobiology Database

Hildoceratoidea
Ammonitida families
Jurassic ammonites
Toarcian first appearances
Middle Jurassic extinctions